Semenanyane Airport  is a well-marked airstrip serving the mission village of Semenanyane in Mokhotlong District, Lesotho. The runway is near the border with Thaba-Tseka District.

See also

 Transport in Lesotho
 List of airports in Lesotho

References

External links
 HERE Maps - Semenanyane
 OpenStreetMap - Semenanyane

Airports in Lesotho